Yenew Alamirew Getahun (born 27 May 1990 in Tilili, Amhara) is an Ethiopian middle and long-distance runner. He represented his country at the 2012 Summer Olympics as well as two indoor and one outdoor World Championships.

Yenew was the 2013 Diamond League winner for the 5000 metres. His two younger brothers Yibel and Engida are also runners.

Achievements

References

External links
 
 
 
 

1990 births
Living people
Ethiopian male long-distance runners
Athletes (track and field) at the 2012 Summer Olympics
Olympic athletes of Ethiopia
African Games silver medalists for Ethiopia
African Games medalists in athletics (track and field)
Athletes (track and field) at the 2011 All-Africa Games
People from Amhara Region
Diamond League winners
21st-century Ethiopian people